Boylan Central Catholic High School is a private Catholic high school located in Rockford, Illinois, United States. Founded in 1960, Boylan is the only Catholic high school in the city.

At the start of the 20102011 school year, there were 1187 students enrolled. Enrollment numbers have decreased in the subsequent years. According to the school's website, in 20152016, the total number of students was only 956. It is located in and administered by the Roman Catholic Diocese of Rockford.

Athletics
Boylan competes in the Northern Illinois Conference (NIC-10), and is a member of the Illinois High School Association (IHSA); the association which governs most sports and competitive activities in the state.  Boys teams are stylized as the Titans, while women's teams are stylized as the Lady Titans.

The school sponsors interscholastic teams for both young men and women in basketball, bowling, cross country, golf, soccer, swimming & diving, soccer, tennis, volleyball and track & field.  Men may compete in baseball, football, and wrestling, while young women may compete in  Soccer, swimming, basketball, track, cross country, golf, bowling, tennis, volleyball, cheerleading and softball.  While not sponsored by the IHSA, the school also sponsors a dance team for women in all grade levels.

The following teams have won their respective IHSA sponsored state championship tournaments or meets:

 Football: 2011 IHSA 7A State Champions. 2010 IHSA 6A State Champions. 
 Golf: 2013 IHSA 2A State Champions. 2002 IHSA 2A State Champions
 Soccer: 2010 IHSA 3A State Champions. 2021 IHSA 2A State Champions.

Notable alumni
Virgil Abloh (1998), former DJ and fashion designer, with notable brands Off-White and Pyrex Vision
 Jodi Benson (1979), American actress and singer, best known for her role as the voice of Princess Ariel from Disney's The Little Mermaid 
 Derek Dimke (2008), former NFL kicker for Tampa Bay Buccaneers
 Robert Greenblatt (1978), American television executive, former Chairman of NBC Entertainment
 Damir Krupalija (1998), Bosnian-American professional basketball executive and former player
 Dan Lindsay (1997), documentary filmmaker who won an Academy Award in 2012 for the documentary Undefeated
 Marin Mazzie (1978), actress and singer best known for her work in musical theater
 Joe Mantello (1980), two–time Tony Award-winning director (Assassins, Take Me Out)
 Anthony Tyler Quinn (1980), American actor who played Jonathan Turner on Boy Meets World
 Jake Smolinski (2007), MLB outfielder, Oakland A's
 Dean Lowry (2012), NFL defensive end for the Green Bay Packers

References

External links
 Boylan Catholic High School

 

Educational institutions established in 1960
Catholic secondary schools in Illinois
Roman Catholic Diocese of Rockford
High schools in Rockford, Illinois
1960 establishments in Illinois